The Chartered Institute of Trade Mark Attorneys (CITMA) was founded in 1934 as the British professional body for trade mark attorneys. 

It received a Royal Charter in 2016 which saw its name change from ITMA. CITMA is a professional organisation supporting and promoting the trade mark attorney profession. It has legal responsibility for regulating the profession, which is delegated to the Intellectual Property Regulation Board (IPReg).

Officers (2020–2022) 
The President of the Chartered Institute of Trade Mark Attorneys is Richard Goddard of BP. Goddard was elected to the position in April 2020.

The First Vice-President is Rachel Wilkinson-Duffy of Baker McKenzie and the Second Vice-President and the Treasurer is Kelly Saliger of CMS.

See also
British professional bodies
Intellectual property organization
List of topics related to the United Kingdom
UK Intellectual Property Office

References

External links
CITMA Website

Organisations based in the City of Westminster
Trade Mark Attorneys
Trademark law organizations
United Kingdom patent law